George Fox was a founder of the Religious Society of Friends (Quakers).

George Fox may also refer to:

People
 George L. Fox (clown) (1825–1877), American comedian
 George L. Fox (chaplain) (1900–1943), American Methodist minister and soldier
 George L. Fox (politician), American lawyer, judge, and politician from New York
 George E. Fox (born 1945), biologist, co-discoverer of Archaea
 George Fox (singer) (born 1960), Canadian singer/songwriter
 George Fox (album), 1988
 George Henry Fox (1846–1937), American dermatologist
George Fox (physician) (1759–1828), physician
 George Fox (poet) (1809–1880), Irish poet
 George Fox (baseball) (1868–1914), 19th-century baseball player
 George Fox (cricketer) (1867–1920), New Zealand cricketer
 George Fox (Australian politician) (1835–1914), member of the Queensland Legislative Assembly
 George Fox (priest) (1913–1978), British Anglican priest and military chaplain
 George Malcolm Fox (1843–1918), Inspector General of Gymnasia for the British Army at Aldershot

Educational institutions
 George Fox Evangelical Seminary, Oregon
 George Fox Six universities, England
 George Fox University, Oregon

See also
George Lane-Fox (disambiguation)

Fox, George